Buck may refer to:

Common meanings
 A colloquialism for a United States dollar
 An adult male animal in some species - see List of animal names
 Derby shoes, nicknamed "bucks" in modern colloquial English, for the common use of buckskin in their making

Arts and entertainment
 BUCK, a My Little Pony fan convention in Manchester, UK
 Buck, someone who excels in the krump dance style
 Buck (film), a 2011 documentary
 Buck (magazine), a defunct UK publication (2008-2011)
 Buck (video game), a 2017 side-scrolling beat 'em up
 Buck: A Memoir, a 2013 book by MK Asante

Companies
 Buck (design company), a design-driven creative commercial production company
 Buck (human resources consulting company), a human resources consulting company
 Buck Knives, an American knife manufacturer

Fictional characters
 Buck, a character in the film Kill Bill: Volume 1 (2003)
 Buck, the canine central character of the 1903 novel The Call of the Wild (with later adaptations in other media)
 Buck, the family dog on the television series Married... with Children (1987–1997)
 Buck, a horse in the film Home on the Range (2004)
 Buck, a main character in the video game 187 Ride or Die (2005)
 Buck, Tuck Turtle's cousin in the animated television series Wonder Pets (2006–2013)
 Buck, a weasel in the animated film Ice Age: Dawn of the Dinosaurs (2009)
 Buck, Arlo's triplet sibling in the animated film The Good Dinosaur (2015)
 Buck Cannon, in the television series The High Chaparral (1967–1971)
 Buck Cluck, Chicken Little's father in the animated film Chicken Little (2005)
 Buck Grangerford, a character in the 1884 novel Adventures of Huckleberry Finn (with later adaptations in other media)
 Buck Huckster, a character in the animated television series Beverly Hills Teens (1987)
 Buck Laughlin, a character in the film Best in Show (2000)
 Buck Mulligan, a character in James Joyce's 1922 novel Ulysses
 Buck O'Brien, protagonist in the film Chuck & Buck (2000)
 Buck Rogers, a science fiction hero introduced in a 1929 comic strip (with later adaptations in other media)
 Buck Russell, the title character in the film Uncle Buck (1989)
 Buck Tuddrussel, a character in the animated television series Time Squad (2001–2003)
 Buck Turgidson, a general in the film Dr. Strangelove (1964)
 Cameron "Buck" Williams, a reporter introduced in 1995 in the Left Behind multimedia franchise
 Gunnery Sergeant Edward Buck, a character introduced to the Halo franchise in the video game Halo 3: ODST (2009)
 Joe Buck, title character in the 1965 novel Midnight Cowboy (with later adaptations in other media)
 Sergeant Buck Frobisher, on the television series Due South (1994–1999)

People
Buck (nickname), people nicknamed Buck
Buck (surname), a list of people

First name
Buck Ellison (born 1987), American artist
Buck Pierce (born 1981), Canadian football quarterback

Stage and ring names
Buck 65, stage name of Canadian hip hop artist Richard Terfry
Buck Angel, stage name of American trans man, adult film producer and performer Jake Miller (born 1972)
Buck Dharma, stage name of American guitarist Donald Roeser (born 1947)
Buck Henry, stage name of American actor, writer, and director Henry Zuckerman (1930–2020)
Buck Jones, stage name of American film actor Charles Gebhart (1891–1942)
Buck Owens, stage name of American singer and guitarist Alvis Owens Jr. (1929–2006)
Young Buck, stage name of American rapper David Darnell Brown (born 1981)

Ring names
Bunkhouse Buck, a ring name of American professional wrestler James Golden (born 1950)
Buck Quartermain and Buck Q, ring names of American professional wrestler Jason Seguine (born 1967)
Buck Zumhofe, a ring name of American professional wrestler Eugene Otto Zumhofe (born 1951)

Places in the United States
 Buck Creek (disambiguation)
 Buck, Pennsylvania, an unincorporated community 
 Buck Township, Hardin County, Ohio
 Buck Township, Luzerne County, Pennsylvania

Other uses
 Buck (cocktail), an alcoholic mixed drink
 Buck (crater), on the planet Venus
 Buck (software), software for building other software
 , several United States Navy ships

See also
 Bucking, a movement by a horse when the animal kicks out with both hind legs
 Bucks (disambiguation)
 Bucky (disambiguation)
 Buk (disambiguation)